Arthuro Henrique Bernhardt (born 27 August 1982), known simply as Arthuro, is a Brazilian former professional footballer who played as a centre forward.

He also held an Italian passport.

Football career
Arthuro was born in Florianópolis, Santa Catarina. After a brief youth spell in Germany with Hamburger SV, he returned to his country to start his professional career, with lowly Criciúma Esporte Clube. The following year, aged just 18, he moved abroad again, spending three years without any first-team appearances for Middlesbrough.

Next stop was Spain, and Arthuro also struggled initially: he only appeared seven times with Racing de Santander's reserves in the third division but fared better in the following years, successively with Sporting de Gijón, Deportivo Alavés and Córdoba CF– he also appeared in six scoreless games with the Basques in 2005–06's La Liga, with relegation.

Released by Alavés in June 2008, Arthuro played in Romania with FC Steaua București until January of the following year, when he transferred to Russian club FC Terek Grozny. Again in quick succession he moved teams again, signing in May with Clube de Regatas do Flamengo.

Arthuro represented his fourth side in one year when he signed with RC Celta de Vigo, also from the Spanish second level. However, in early January 2010, both parties agreed to terminate his contract after poor performances overall (he failed to score a single official goal) and failure to adjust to the city; he immediately found a new club, joining Al Dhafra S.C.C. in the United Arab Emirates.

Late in 2010, Arthuro moved to Portugal and joined U.D. Leiria, but quickly returned to his homeland and signed for Avaí Futebol Clube. After only a couple of matches he changed teams and countries again, joining Johor Darul Takzim F.C. in Malaysia.

References

External links

Stats at El Mundo 

1982 births
Living people
Brazilian people of German descent
Brazilian people of Italian descent
Sportspeople from Florianópolis
Brazilian footballers
Association football forwards
Criciúma Esporte Clube players
CR Flamengo footballers
Avaí FC players
Middlesbrough F.C. players
La Liga players
Segunda División players
Segunda División B players
Rayo Cantabria players
Racing de Santander players
Sporting de Gijón players
Deportivo Alavés players
Córdoba CF players
RC Celta de Vigo players
Recreativo de Huelva players
CE Sabadell FC footballers
Liga I players
FC Steaua București players
FC Akhmat Grozny players
UAE Pro League players
Al Dhafra FC players
Primeira Liga players
Liga Portugal 2 players
U.D. Leiria players
C.F. União players
G.D. Estoril Praia players
Malaysia Super League players
Johor Darul Ta'zim F.C. players
Brazilian expatriate footballers
Expatriate footballers in Germany
Expatriate footballers in England
Expatriate footballers in Spain
Expatriate footballers in Romania
Expatriate footballers in Russia
Expatriate footballers in the United Arab Emirates
Expatriate footballers in Portugal
Expatriate footballers in Malaysia
Expatriate footballers in Luxembourg
Brazilian expatriate sportspeople in Germany
Brazilian expatriate sportspeople in Spain
Brazilian expatriate sportspeople in Romania
Brazilian expatriate sportspeople in Portugal